Joseph Prathan Sridanusil SDB (born February 9, 1946) is the bishop of the Roman Catholic diocese of Surat Thani, Thailand.

Born in Wat Phleng, Ratchaburi Province, he in 1964 joined the order of the Salesians of Don Bosco in Hua Hin. He studied philosophy in Hong Kong and theology in Bethlehem. On June 29, 1975 he was ordained to the priesthood by Pope Paul VI in Rome.

In the following years he had several posts at the Thai Catholic church, until he was appointed to be the bishop of Surat Thani on October 9, 2004. He was installed as bishop on November 28 by Crescenzio Sepe, Cardinal Prefect of the Congregation for the Evangelization of Peoples.

Coat of arms

The shield of the bishopric coat of arms consists of three symbols. The golden color represents the faith. The monstrance with the host in the middle of the shield symbolizes the central standing of Jesus Christ. The star in the top left corner stands for Mother Mary. The book to the right is the holy bible, the inspiration for live and work. The motto below Fiat voluntas tua (Thy Will be done) is the fourth line of the Lord's Prayer.

References

External links

Catholic hierarchy

1946 births
Living people
21st-century Roman Catholic bishops in Thailand
Salesian bishops
Joseph Prathan Sridarunsil